Athanasios Moutsios (born 10 October 1978) is a retired Greek football midfielder.

References

1978 births
Living people
Greek footballers
Iraklis Thessaloniki F.C. players
Panserraikos F.C. players
Kalamata F.C. players
Doxa Drama F.C. players
Diagoras F.C. players
Association football midfielders
Super League Greece players
Footballers from Drama, Greece